Robert Harry Alwin (August 12, 1920 – October 8, 2003) was an American professional basketball player.

Professional career 
He played for the Oshkosh All-Stars in the National Basketball League for four games during the 1942–43 season and averaged 5.3 points per game.

References

External links
 Robert Alwin obituary
Basketball.com Profile

1920 births
2003 deaths
American men's basketball players
Basketball coaches from Wisconsin
Basketball players from Wisconsin
Guards (basketball)
High school basketball coaches in Wisconsin
High school football coaches in Wisconsin
Madison East High School alumni
Oshkosh All-Stars players
Sportspeople from Madison, Wisconsin
Wisconsin Badgers men's basketball players